Jozef John Zwislocki (March 22, 1922 – May 14, 2018) was a Polish-born American neuroscientist.

A native of Lwow, Poland, Zwislocki attended the Federal Institute of Technology in Zurich, Switzerland, and taught at the University of Basel from 1945 to 1951. He left for a research fellowship at Harvard University and was a member of the Syracuse University faculty between 1957 and 1992. Zwislocki held twelve patents. Over the course of his career, Zwislocki was granted fellowship into the Acoustical Society of America, as well as membership to the United States National Academy of Sciences, Polish Academy of Sciences, American Association for the Advancement of Science, and Association for Research in Otolaryngology, among others. He lived in Fayetteville, New York, and died on May 14, 2018, aged 96.

References

1922 births
2018 deaths
American neuroscientists
Auditory scientists
Polish emigrants to the United States
ETH Zurich alumni
Syracuse University faculty
Academic staff of the University of Basel
Scientists from Lviv
Fellows of the Acoustical Society of America
Members of the Polish Academy of Sciences
Members of the United States National Academy of Sciences
Fellows of the American Association for the Advancement of Science